is a Japanese football player.

Playing career
Murotsu was born in Osaka Prefecture on April 12, 2000. He joined J1 League club Cerezo Osaka from youth team in 2018.

References

External links

2000 births
Living people
Association football people from Osaka Prefecture
Japanese footballers
J1 League players
J3 League players
Cerezo Osaka players
Cerezo Osaka U-23 players
Association football defenders